Cüneyt Yis (born 11 August 1976) is a retired Turkish football midfielder.

References

1976 births
Living people
Turkish footballers
İzmirspor footballers
Altay S.K. footballers
Konyaspor footballers
Kayserispor footballers
Şanlıurfaspor footballers
Mersin İdman Yurdu footballers
Alanyaspor footballers
Association football midfielders
Süper Lig players